Allen R. Schindler Jr. (December 13, 1969 – October 27, 1992) was an American Radioman Petty Officer Third Class in the United States Navy who was murdered for being gay. He was killed in a public toilet in Sasebo, Nagasaki, Japan, by Terry M. Helvey, who acted with the aid of an accomplice, Charles E. Vins, in what Esquire called a "brutal murder". The case became synonymous with the debate concerning LGBT members of the military that had been brewing in the United States, culminating in the "Don't ask, don't tell" bill.

Schindler's killing remained front-page news throughout the spring of 1993. The case was later featured in The New York Times and Esquire.

The events surrounding Schindler's murder were the subject of ABC's 20/20 episode and were portrayed in the 1997 TV film Any Mother's Son. In 1998, Any Mother's Son won a GLAAD Media Award for Outstanding Made for TV Movie.

Background
Allen R. Schindler Jr. was born on December 13, 1969 in Chicago Heights, Cook County, Illinois to Dorothy Hajdys, now known as Clausen or Hajdys-Clausen, and Allen Schindler Sr. Schindler was from a naval family and was serving as a radioman on the amphibious assault ship  in Sasebo, Nagasaki.

According to several of his friends, Schindler had complained repeatedly of anti-gay harassment to his chain of command in March and April 1992, citing incidents such as the gluing-shut of his locker and frequent comments from shipmates such as "There's a faggot on this ship and he should die". Schindler had begun the separation process to leave the Navy, but his superiors insisted he remain on his ship until the process was finished. Though he knew his safety was at risk, Schindler obeyed orders.

While on transport from San Diego, California, to Sasebo, the USS Belleau Wood made a brief stop in Pearl Harbor, Hawaii. Afterward, en route to Japan, Schindler broadcast an unauthorized statement "2-Q-T-2-B-S-T-R-8" (too cute to be straight) on secure lines reaching much of the Pacific Fleet. When he appeared at captain's mast for the unauthorized radio message, he requested that the hearing be closed. It was open, with two hundred to three hundred people in attendance. Schindler was put on restrictive leave and was unable to leave the ship until a few weeks after arriving at Sasebo and four days before his death.

Murder
Airman Apprentice Terry M. Helvey, who was a member of the ship's weather department (OA Division, Operations Department), stomped Schindler to death in a bathroom in a park in Sasebo, Nagasaki. A key witness, Jonathan Witte, saw Helvey repeatedly stomp on Schindler's body while singing. Witte then ran to retrieve Shore Patrolmen nearby, which startled Helvey and his accomplice, Charles E. Vins, into running from the bathroom. Witte returned with Shore Patrolmen in less than 30 seconds and saw Allen Schindler lying on the floor, struggling to breathe through a mouthful of blood. Witte and Shore Patrolmen carried Schindler to the nearby Albuquerque Bridge where he died from his injuries. Witte had met Schindler previously two days before his murder, but given the gravity of his injuries, he was unable to recognize Schindler. Schindler had "at least four fatal injuries to the head, chest, and abdomen," his face and head was crushed, and the globes of his eyes were burst and ruptured. His nose was broken; his upper jaw was broken; the whole middle portion of his face was detached and floating loosely. There were bruises and cuts on the surface of his neck, head, and chest; there were bruises on his brain, on his lungs, his heart. He had eight broken ribs, and his Adam's apple was obliterated. His liver had been turned to pulp "like a tomato smushed up inside its cover." The impact of blows to the chest had torn his aorta, his bladder had been ripped open, his penis had been bruised and lacerated, and he had "sneaker-tread marks stamped on his forehead and chest", destroying "every organ in his body", leaving behind a "nearly unrecognizable corpse." Witte was asked to explain in detail to the military court what the crime scene looked like, but he refused, as Schindler's mother and sister were present in the courtroom. His family was only able to identify him by the tattoos on his arms.

Details revealed

The Navy was less than forthcoming about the details of the killing, both to the news media and to the victim's family, especially his mother, Dorothy Hajdys-Clausen. Navy officials failed to include his belongings: the log book Schindler kept of his time on board, and his record of harassment he was receiving on the advice of friends.

In the wake of Schindler's murder, the Navy denied that it had received any complaints of harassment and refused to speak publicly about the case or to release the Japanese police report on the murder.

The medical examiner compared Schindler's injuries to those sustained by a victim of a fatal horse trampling saying they were worse "than the damage to a person who'd been stomped by a horse; they were similar to what might be sustained in a high-speed car crash or a low-speed aircraft accident."

On November 7, 1992, a wake was held for Schindler in his hometown of Chicago Heights, Illinois. Schindler was buried with full military honors. The day before, when Schindler's family were called down to the funeral home, his mother asked that his coffin be opened after the Navy advised against it. "There was a sailor in dress blues ... but it looked nothing like the boy I'd kissed goodbye two months earlier," Hajdys-Clausen said. At the wake, Schindler's sister Kathy asked that the coffin be opened again. They could only identify him by the tattoos on his arms, as his face was so disfigured.

Trial and outcomes
During the trial, Helvey denied that he killed Schindler because he was gay, stating, "I did not attack him because he was homosexual", but evidence presented by Navy investigator Kennon F. Privette, from the interrogation of Helvey the day after the murder, showed otherwise. "He said he hated homosexuals. He was disgusted by them," Privette said. On killing Schindler, Privette quoted Helvey as saying: "I don't regret it. I'd do it again. ... He deserved it."

To avoid a possible death sentence, Helvey pleaded guilty to unpremeditated murder, which carries a maximum sentence of life in prison.

After the trial, Helvey was convicted of murder and Douglas J. Bradt, the captain who kept the incident quiet, was transferred to shore duty in Florida. Helvey is serving a life sentence. By statute, Helvey is granted a clemency hearing every year. Initially, he was imprisoned in the United States Disciplinary Barracks. , he is housed at FCI Greenville in Illinois under the inmate number 13867-045. Helvey's accomplice, Charles E. Vins, was allowed to plea bargain as guilty to three lesser offenses, including failure to report a serious crime and to testify truthfully against Helvey, and served a 78-day sentence before receiving a general discharge from the Navy.

Legacy
The events surrounding Schindler's murder were the subject of a 20/20 episode and were portrayed in the 1997 TV film Any Mother's Son. In 1998, Any Mother's Son won a GLAAD Media Award for Outstanding Made for TV Movie.

Schindler's mother Dorothy Hajdys-Clausen became a gay rights activist after his murder. In 1992 she received the National Leather Association International's Jan Lyon Award for Regional or Local Work. In 1993 she marched in the March on Washington for Lesbian, Gay and Bi Equal Rights and Liberation, and on June 27, she led the Gay Pride Parade in Chicago. In 2011, Hajdys-Clausen went to Washington, D.C., to celebrate the repeal of DADT. "I'm so happy 'Don't Ask Don't Tell' got repealed." Dorothy said. "I just hope now there will be no more deaths like Allen Schindler's."

Schindler's case was presented in the 2018 TV documentary crime series, The 1990s: The Deadliest Decade, season 1, episode 8, "Don't Ask Don't Tell." The episode, which aired on Jan. 7, 2019, on Investigation Discovery, chronicled the events that led up to Schindler's murder and featured excerpts from Schindler's journal and autopsy report, as well as details from veteran LGBTQ rights activist, Michael Petrelis' 900-page file on Schindler and Terry Helvey's written confession. Interviews were given by Allen Schindler's mother, Dorothy Hajdys-Clausen, Jonathan Witte, Michael Petrelis, and former reporter for the Stars and Stripes, Rick Rogers.

In 2020, U.S. Navy veteran Shon Washington honored Schindler on the 28th anniversary of his death in a viral social media post sharing his experiences as a gay Navy officer serving under DADT. Washington ended the post by thanking Schindler and his mother for impacting his life and helping repair his fraught relationship with his own mother.

Schindler is buried in Evergreen Hill Memory Gardens in Steger, Will County, Illinois. The date of death on Schindler's gravestone is marked October 28, 1992, in accordance to the doctor's pronouncement of death.

See also

Barry Winchell
Judge Advocate General's Corps
Military law

References

External links
Allen R. Schindler, Jr. FB Memorial Page
Memorial Hall: Allen Schindler, Jr.
Allen Schindler, Jr. news via Servicemembers Legal Defense Network
Crime of Gay Hate, the murder of Allen Schindler

1969 births
1992 deaths
20th-century American military personnel
United States Navy sailors
American people murdered abroad
American victims of anti-LGBT hate crimes
American LGBT military personnel
1992 in LGBT history
LGBT people from Illinois
People from Chicago Heights, Illinois
Military personnel from Illinois
Deaths by beating
People murdered in Japan
Violence against gay men
1992 murders in Japan
October 1992 events in Asia
Violence against men in Asia
20th-century American LGBT people
People convicted of murder by the United States military